The Chauchat-Ribeyrolles 1918 submachine gun is a French prototype automatic weapon.

In 1917, the French Army adopted the Mle. 1917 semi-automatic rifle made by Ribeyrolles, Sutter and Chauchat (RSC), who already developed the "Chauchat" Mle. 1915 LMG.

In 1918, they presented a "pistolet-mitrailleur" (submachine gun), meant to be used for close-range protection for the French tank crews. The weapon is based on the RSC Mle. 1917 semi-automatic rifle mechanism. The first trials used a Mannlicher–Berthier clip holding eight cartridges. The trials continued until 1919 with a weapon using the same magazine as the Chauchat. The results were satisfactory but the weapon was too powerful for the intended self-protection use. A mix of standard and tracer bullets was planned to be used to assist in aiming.

See also 
 Ribeyrolles 1918 automatic carbine
 M231 Firing Port Weapon

References
  has info from  cf. 
 Ribeyrolles 1917 at securityarms.com

Further reading

External links
 pictures (2nd and 3rd)

World War I French infantry weapons
World War I submachine guns
Submachine guns of France
Personal defense weapons